Metin Çelik (born 3 April 1970 in Gölcük) is a Turkish-Dutch politician and former police officer. As a member of the Dutch Labour Party (Partij van de Arbeid) he was an MP from 17 June 2010 to 19 September 2012. He focused on matters of primary, secondary and special education. As of 28 March, 2019, he has been the chairman of the DENK political party.

Çelik is a former police officer of the city of Rotterdam and its suburbs. From 1998 to 2010, he was a member of the municipal council of Rotterdam.

References 
  Parlement.com biography

1970 births
Living people
DENK politicians
Dutch people of Turkish descent
Dutch police officers
Knights of the Order of Orange-Nassau
Labour Party (Netherlands) politicians
Members of the 25th Parliament of Turkey
Members of the House of Representatives (Netherlands)
Municipal councillors of Rotterdam
People from Gölcük
Turkish emigrants to the Netherlands
21st-century Dutch politicians